Lucille Collard  is a Canadian politician who has been a member of Provincial Parliament (MPP) since 2020. A member of the Ontario Liberal Party, Collard represents Ottawa—Vanier in the Legislative Assembly of Ontario.

Background 
Collard completed a law degree at the University of Ottawa in 1999 and pursued a public service career as a lawyer. She practised international trade law with the NAFTA Secretariat, administrative and regulatory law with the Canadian Nuclear Safety Commission and public law as a federal government civil litigator at the Federal Court of Canada.

Collard is a mother of four children and has reported education as a personal interest. In 2003, she launched a pilot francophone school with 18 students – Trille des Bois – which was officially opened in 2010. Today, 600 students attend Trille des Bois.

Political career

Trustee 
Collard first ran for public office in 2010 and was elected as a School Trustee for the Ottawa-Vanier, Ottawa-Rockcliffe region. She was re-elected in 2014 and 2018. Following her second re-election, she was elected as Chair of the Board of the Conseil des écoles publiques de l'Est de l'Ontario.

Provincial politics 
In early 2020, Collard won the Liberal nomination for the by-election to the provincial electoral district of Ottawa-Vanier, which was vacated by Nathalie Des Rosiers. She was elected on February 7, 2020, with 52.2% of the vote.

In the Legislative Assembly of Ontario, she serves as the Liberal opposition critic for the following ministerial portfolios:

 Ministry of the Attorney General (the provincial judiciary, criminal justice system and legal defence of the Government of Ontario)
 Ministry of the Solicitor General (law enforcement, penitentiary and correctional services)
 Office of Women's Issues
 Ministry of the Environment, Conservation and Parks

She was re-elected in the 2022 Ontario general election.

References

Ontario Liberal Party MPPs
21st-century Canadian politicians
Living people
Politicians from Ottawa
Women MPPs in Ontario
Ontario school board trustees
Franco-Ontarian people
Year of birth missing (living people)
21st-century Canadian women politicians